Al Saqr Sport & Cultural Club is a Yemeni football club based in Taiz, Yemen, Saqr means "Falcons" in English. The club was founded in 1969.

ِِAlsaqr Sports Club in Taiz typical first club in Yemen in terms of infrastructure and sports facilities for the exercise of all of the games and sports activities and entertainment outlets, making Alsaqr Club tourist site in Taiz

Characterized the administrative work in the Alsaqr Club commitment and regularity and discipline and these features do not exist only in the big clubs and so we see successes continued Alsaqr Club continues on all sides and is expected to be Alsaqr Club during the three coming years best Gym in Yemen become a sports institution and social and educational club

The club also features an Alsaqr from other clubs Yemeni presence of integrated infrastructure, where he owns a major stadium for football lush artificial turf Abu walad stadium accommodate more than five thousand fans

Achievements
 Yemeni League
Champions (3): 2006, 2010, 2014
 Yemeni Unity Cup
Winners (2): 2008, 2010

Seasons
Performance in AFC competitions
 AFC Cup: 2 appearances'''
2007: Group stage
2011: Group stage

Current squad

References

External links 

 

Saqr
Saqr
Association football clubs established in 1969
1969 establishments in Yemen